Ottawa Fury may refer to:
 Ottawa Fury FC (2014–2019), a defunct professional soccer team in the NASL and USL Championship
 Ottawa Fury SC (2005–2013), a defunct soccer team in the USL Premier Development League
 Ottawa Fury (women) (2000–2014), a defunct women's soccer team in the USL W-League
 Ottawa Fury FC Academy, a defunct soccer academy and men's semi-professional team in the PLSQ